Madonna and Child with Saints is a 1515 oil on panel painting by Cima da Conegliano, now in the Cleveland Museum of Art, Ohio.

Description
At the bottom left and right it portrays the married couple who probably commissioned it for private devotion. The husband may have been named Antonio, since the saint presenting him is Anthony the Great. The work seems to have been left incomplete - the saint on the right (Lucy or Mary Magdalene) hold out her right hand but does not hold an attribute.

References

External links
 

1515 paintings
Paintings of the Madonna and Child by Cima da Conegliano
Paintings in the collection of the Cleveland Museum of Art
Paintings of Saint Lucy
Paintings of saints
Paintings depicting Mary Magdalene
Paintings of Anthony the Great